

Olethreutes is a large genus of tortrix moths (family Tortricidae). It is the type genus of its tribe (Olethreutini) and subfamily (Olethreutinae).

Celyphoides, Loxoterma and Paracelypha are sometimes listed as junior synonyms of Olethreutes. But the type species of the first is Tortrix flavipalpana (now Celypha flavipalpana), that of the second is T. latifasciana (now C. aurofasciana), and that of the third is Phalaena rivulana (now Syricoris rivulana). This makes Celyphoides and Loxoterma junior subjective synonyms of Celypha and Paracelypha a junior subjective synonym of Syricoris, at least according to the present delimitation of these genera.

Species
This genus has long served as "wastebin genus" for Olethreutinae, many of which were formerly placed here but are nowadays assigned to related genera. Especially Argyroploce was included in Olethreutes by some authors even in recent times. Phiaris micana (the type species of Phiaris) has erroneously been listed in the present genus, even though Phiaris is generally regarded as distinct; its delimitation versus Olethreutes requires more study however.

The 131 species at least provisionally placed in Olethreutes today are:

 Olethreutes agatha Falkovitsh, 1966
 Olethreutes agnota Diakonoff, 1973
 Olethreutes albiciliana (Fernald, 1882)
 Olethreutes aliana Kawabe, 1993
 Olethreutes anisorrhopa Diakonoff, 1983
 Olethreutes appalachiana (Braun, 1951)
 Olethreutes appendiceum (Zeller, 1875)
 Olethreutes arcuella
 Olethreutes astrologana (Zeller, 1875)
 Olethreutes atrodentana (Fernald, 1882)
 Olethreutes auricapitana (Walsingham, 1879)
 Olethreutes aviana (Falkovitsh, 1959)
 Olethreutes baccatana (McDunnough, 1942)
 Olethreutes bicoloranum (McDunnough, 1922)
 Olethreutes bidentata Kuznetzov, 1971
 Olethreutes bipartitana (Clemens, 1860)
 Olethreutes bowmanana (McDunnough, 1923)
 Olethreutes brevirostratum (Heinrich, 1926)
 Olethreutes brunneopurpurata (Heinrich, 1923)
 Olethreutes buckellana (McDunnough, 1922)
 Olethreutes cacuminana (Kennel, 1901)
 Olethreutes camillana (Kennel, 1918)
 Olethreutes cana Kawabe, 1993
 Olethreutes capnodesma (Meyrick, 1922)
 Olethreutes captiosana (Falkovitsh, 1960)
 Olethreutes carolana (McDunnough, 1922)
 Olethreutes clavana (Walker, 1863)
 Olethreutes comandranum (Clarke, 1953)
 Olethreutes concinnana (Clemens, 1865)
 Olethreutes connectum (McDunnough, 1935)
 Olethreutes coruscana (Clemens, 1860)
 Olethreutes corylana (Fernald, 1882)
 Olethreutes costimaculana (Fernald, 1882)
 Olethreutes delitana (Staudinger, 1880)
 Olethreutes deprecatoria Heinrich, 1926
 Olethreutes devotana Kearfott, 1907
 Olethreutes diallacta (Meyrick, 1932)
 Olethreutes dissolutana (Stange, 1886)
 Olethreutes doubledayana (Barrett, 1872)
 Olethreutes electrofuscum (Heinrich, 1923)
 Olethreutes ernestiana (Obraztsov, 1961)
 Olethreutes exaeresimum (Heinrich, 1926)
 Olethreutes exaridanus Kuznetzov in Kuznetzov & Mikkola, 1991
 Olethreutes exoletum (Zeller, 1875)
 Olethreutes fagigemmeana (Chambers, 1878)
 Olethreutes fasciatana (Clemens, 1860)
 Olethreutes ferriferana (Walker, 1863)
 Olethreutes ferrolineana (Walker, 1863)
 Olethreutes ferrugineanum (Riley, 1881)
 Olethreutes flammanus Kawabe, 1993
 Olethreutes footiana (Fernald, 1882)
 Olethreutes fraternanum (McDunnough, 1924)
 Olethreutes furfuranum (McDunnough, 1922)
 Olethreutes galaxana Kearfott, 1907
 Olethreutes galevora (McDunnough, 1956)
 Olethreutes glaciana (Möschler, 1860)
 Olethreutes griseoalbana (Walsingham, 1879)
 Olethreutes hamameliana (McDunnough, 1944)
 Olethreutes heinrichana (McDunnough, 1927)
 Olethreutes helveticana (Duponchel, 1844)
 Olethreutes hemiplaca (Meyrick, 1922)
 Olethreutes hippocastanum (Kearfott, 1907)
 Olethreutes humeralis (Walsingham, 1900)
 Olethreutes hummeli (Caradja, 1935)
 Olethreutes ineptana (Kennel, 1901)
 Olethreutes inornatana (Clemens, 1860)
 Olethreutes inquietana (Walker, 1863)
 Olethreutes irina Falkovitsh, 1966
 Olethreutes kamtshadala (Falkovitsh, 1966)
 Olethreutes kennethana McDunnough, 1941
 Olethreutes kurdistana (Amsel, 1959)
 Olethreutes lacunana (Freeman, 1941)
 Olethreutes magadana (Falkovitsh, 1965)
 Olethreutes malana (Fernald, 1882)
 Olethreutes manoi (Kawabe, 1987)
 Olethreutes mediopartitum (Heinrich, 1923)
 Olethreutes meifengensis Kawabe, 1993
 Olethreutes melanomesum (Heinrich, 1923)
 Olethreutes mengelana (Fernald, 1894)
 Olethreutes merrickanum (Kearfott, 1907)
 Olethreutes metallicana (Hübner, [1799])
 Olethreutes minaki (McDunnough, 1929)
 Olethreutes moderata Falkovitsh, 1962
 Olethreutes monetiferanum (Riley, 1881)
 Olethreutes mysteriana Miller, 1979
 Olethreutes nananum (McDunnough, 1922)
 Olethreutes nigranum (Heinrich, 1923)
 Olethreutes nigricrista Kuznetzov, 1976
 Olethreutes nitidana (Clemens, 1860)
 Olethreutes nomas Diakonoff, 1983
 Olethreutes nordeggana (McDunnough, 1922)
 Olethreutes nubicincta Diakonoff, 1973
 Olethreutes obovata (Walsingham, 1900)
 Olethreutes obsoletana (Zetterstedt, 1839)
 Olethreutes ochrosuffusanum (Heinrich, 1923)
 Olethreutes olivaceana (Fernald, 1882)
 Olethreutes orthocosma (Meyrick, 1931)
 Olethreutes osmundana (Fernald, 1879)
 Olethreutes palustrana (Lienig & Zeller, 1846)
 Olethreutes perdicoptera (Wileman & Stringer, 1929)
 Olethreutes permundana (Clemens, 1860)
 Olethreutes pfeifferiana (Obraztsov, 1961)
 Olethreutes polluxana (McDunnough, 1922)
 Olethreutes praeterminata (Caradja, 1933)
 Olethreutes predotai Hartig, 1938
 Olethreutes punctanum (Walsingham, 1903)
 Olethreutes quadrifidum (Zeller, 1875)
 Olethreutes rusticanum (McDunnough, 1922)
 Olethreutes sayonae Kawabe, 1993
 Olethreutes schulziana (Fabricius, 1776)
 Olethreutes sciotana (Heinrich, 1923)
 Olethreutes scoriana (Guenée, 1845)
 Olethreutes septentrionana (Curtis in Ross, 1835)
 Olethreutes sericoranum (Walsingham, 1879)
 Olethreutes sordidana (McDunnough, 1922)
 Olethreutes spiraeanus Kuznetzov, 1962
 Olethreutes stibiana (Guenée, 1845)
 Olethreutes submissanum (McDunnough, 1922)
 Olethreutes subnubilum (Heinrich, 1923)
 Olethreutes subretracta Kawabe, 1976
 Olethreutes subtilana (Falkovitsh, 1959)
 Olethreutes tenebricum (Heinrich, 1926)
 Olethreutes tephrea Falkovitsh, 1966
 Olethreutes tilianum (Heinrich, 1923)
 Olethreutes trinitana (McDunnough, 1931)
 Olethreutes troglodanum (McDunnough, 1922)
 Olethreutes turfosana (Herrich-Schäffer, 1851)
 Olethreutes umbrosana (Freyer, 1842)
 Olethreutes valdanum (McDunnough, 1922)
 Olethreutes versicolorana (Clemens, 1860)
 Olethreutes viburnanum (McDunnough, 1935)

Footnotes

References

  (2009a): Online World Catalogue of the Tortricidae – Genus Olethreutes account. Version 1.3.1. Retrieved 2009-JAN-20.
  (2009b): Online World Catalogue of the Tortricidae – Olethreutes species list. Version 1.3.1. Retrieved 2009-JAN-20.
  (2004): Markku Savela's Lepidoptera and some other life forms – Phiaris. Version of 2004-DEC-24. Retrieved 2010-APR-19.
  (2005): Markku Savela's Lepidoptera and some other life forms – Olethreutes. Version of 2005-SEP-16. Retrieved 2010-APR-15.

Olethreutini
Tortricidae genera
Taxa named by Jacob Hübner